WKJK (1080 AM) is an radio station broadcasting a talk radio format. Licensed to Louisville, Kentucky, the station serves North-Central Kentucky and South-Central Indiana.  The station is owned by iHeartMedia, Inc. and features programming from iHeart subsidiary Premiere Networks as well as Compass Media Networks.  The station's studios are located in the Louisville neighborhood of Watterson Park and the transmitter site is off East Daisy Lane in New Albany, Indiana.

WKJK formerly broadcast in HD Radio.  Its daytime power is 10,000 watts.  Because AM 1080 is a clear-channel frequency, WKJK must reduce power at night to 1,000 watts to protect the Class A stations on 1080 kHz, KRLD Dallas, Texas and WTIC Hartford, Connecticut.

History
For most of its early years, the station was known as WKLO, owned by Dayton, Ohio-based Great Trails Broadcasting, which also owned several other Top 40 outlets, all of them in Ohio including WING, WIZE, WCOL (AM), WCOL-FM (also known as 92X WXGT throughout most of the 1980s) and WGTZ. WKLO provided competition to Louisville's main Top 40 station, WAKY/790 (now WKRD). In 1979, 1080 became WKJJ, a 24/7 delayed broadcast of its FM sister WKJJ-FM (99.7 FM, now WDJX). Afterward, it became WCII with several formats, most notably country music, oldies and Christian music, before returning to a simulcast of its FM sister and their Top 40 format in September 1988 (though it would briefly break away for an all-news format). On June 24, 1991, the station flipped to Christian talk after it was leased out to different operators. Six months later, on January 13, 1992, it flipped back to a simulcast of their FM sister. In 1992 a fire at the base of one of the towers briefly took the station off the air. The station was assigned the call letters WWSN on May 15, 1993 (as part of a warehousing move to put the call letters on 107.7 FM after it signed on later in the year). By August, the AM would occasionally split from the simulcast to air some alternative rock programming. Several months later, on October 15, 1993, the station changed its call sign to WDJX. In September 1994, it would break away from the simulcast and flip back to all-news as "The News Resource", WRES. During this time, the station aired AP Radio News and Talknet programs. In July 1995, it flipped to classic country as "The Hawk", 'WHKW, which was moved from 98.9 FM. It later became "KJ 1080", WKJK. On June 7, 1997, the station flipped to adult standards. It moved to a talk format in 1999.

Programming
WKJK's weekday lineup is made up of mostly nationally syndicated programs.  The schedule includes This Morning, America's First News with Gordon Deal, The Ramsey Show, The Sean Hannity Show (both of which are broadcast on a delay), Joe Pags and America Now.  Weekends feature shows on money, gardening, travel and computers, including syndicated shows from Kim Komando and Gary Sullivan.

As a sister station of 840 WHAS, WKJK is a secondary home for University of Kentucky sports, including women's basketball and baseball games.  Most hours begin with national news from CBS News Radio.

References

External links
FCC History Cards for WKJK 

WKLO Top 40 tribute site (with audio archives)
WKJJ's page on LKYRadio

KJK
News and talk radio stations in the United States
Radio stations established in 1948
1948 establishments in Kentucky
IHeartMedia radio stations